John Frederick Campbell, 1st Earl Cawdor  (8 November 1790 – 7 November 1860) was a British peer and MP.

He was born the son of John Campbell, 1st Baron Cawdor and Lady Caroline Howard and educated at Eton and Christ Church, Oxford, graduating BA in 1812. In 1827 he became Viscount Emlyn of Emlyn and Earl Cawdor of Castlemartin in the county of Pembroke.

In June 1812, he was elected a Fellow of the Royal Society. That same year, he stood for election to the House of Commons for Pembrokeshire after the sitting member, Lord Milford, stood down in his favour. Campbell was, however, defeated by Sir John Owen of Orielton. 

He was MP for Carmarthen from 1813 to 1821 and Lord Lieutenant of Carmarthenshire from 1817 to 1860. He died on his family estate at Stackpole, Pembrokeshire.

Family

He had married Lady Elizabeth Thynne, daughter of Thomas Thynne, 2nd Marquess of Bath and the Honourable Isabella Elizabeth Byng, on 5 September 1816. They had seven children:
Lady Georgiana Campbell.
John Frederick Vaughan Campbell, 2nd Earl Cawdor (1817–1898).
Lady Emily Caroline Campbell (1819–1911), who married Octavius Duncombe. She served as a Lady-in-waiting to the Duchess of Cambridge at the 1838 coronation of Queen Victoria.
Lady Elizabeth Lucy Campbell (1822–1898) – John Cuffe, 3rd Earl of Desart
Lady Mary Louisa Campbell (1825–1916), who married George Egerton, 2nd Earl of Ellesmere.
Reverend Hon. Archibald George Campbell (1827–1902).
Lieutenant-Colonel Hon. Henry Walter Campbell (1835–1910).

References

Sources

External links

1790 births
1860 deaths
Earls in the Peerage of the United Kingdom
Lord-Lieutenants of Carmarthenshire
Campbell, John Frederick
UK MPs 1812–1818
UK MPs 1818–1820
UK MPs 1820–1826
Cawdor, E1
UK MPs who were granted peerages
Fellows of the Royal Society
1
People educated at Eton College
Alumni of Christ Church, Oxford
Peers of the United Kingdom created by George IV